"Blue Letter" is a song written by brothers Richard and Michael Curtis, first released by British-American rock band Fleetwood Mac on their eponymous 1975 album, Fleetwood Mac.

It was the only song on the album not written by a band member.

Background
Brothers Michael and Richard Curtis met the young couple Stevie Nicks and Lindsey Buckingham, then known as rock duo Buckingham Nicks and unaffiliated with Fleetwood Mac, through Polydor Records. The group of four became fast friends and worked together on two demos. The first was “Blue Letter”, which, like many of the songs on the Fleetwood Mac album, was intended for the second Buckingham Nicks LP. Unlike “Blue Letter”, the second demo titled “Seven League Boots” was not adopted by the group and was later reworked to become Crosby, Stills, and Nash’s 1982 hit, “Southern Cross”.

According to drummer Mick Fleetwood’s autobiography, Play On: Now, Then, and Fleetwood Mac, the choice to record “Blue Letter” towards the end of the production of the Fleetwood Mac album, slated for release in 1975, was very last minute. While they were recording the album at Sound City with producer Keith Olsen, they heard Michael and Richard Curtis recording the song and decided to add it. It was one of two last-minute additions, along with what Fleetwood called a “reinterpretation” of “World Turning” by Peter Green, the founder and original guitarist of the group.

The Buckingham Nicks studio recordings of this song have yet to surface, but live recordings of Buckingham Nicks performing in January 1975 include an early version of the track.

Meaning and legacy
Although it was not written by Lindsey Buckingham and Stevie Nicks primarily, there are those that believe that this song ties into their tumultuous romance. The couple's eventual breakup after years of drama came to characterize Fleetwood Mac's legacy, and they were having difficulties in their relationship as early as 1975 when they recorded "Blue Letter". It is possible that this vaguely antagonistic track foreshadows more explicit breakup songs such as the Rumours hit, “Go Your Own Way”. However, the band’s comparative lack of public dialogue on the track combined with its more figurative lyrics make it impossible to discern any one true meaning.

The song also inspired the name of a set of Fleetwood Mac related archives, called "The Blue Letter Archives", self-described as the site for “over 750 articles published about the band, reviews of their albums, and information regarding their solo careers”.

Remix
In 1976, Ken Caillat remixed "Over My Head," "Rhiannon," "Say You Love Me," and "Blue Letter" for single releases. These mixes were included on the 2004 and 2018 reissues of Fleetwood Mac.

References

1975 songs
Fleetwood Mac songs
1976 singles
Warner Records singles